Miss Universe Australia 2022 was the 18th edition of the Miss Universe Australia pageant held at the Warner Bros. Movie World in Gold Coast, Queensland on September 9, 2022. Daria Varlamova of Victoria crowned her successor Monique Riley of New South Wales at the end of the event. She will represent Australia at the upcoming Miss Universe 2022 pageant.

Results

Placements

Candidates
The delegates are as follows:

References

External links
Official Website

2022
2022 beauty pageants
2022 in Australia